Hari Darshan is a 1972 Bollywood religious film directed by Chandrakan. The film stars Dara Singh & other artists of Indian film Industry, who portray different characters during the time of Bhakt Prahlad.
The story revolves around the devotee Prahlad. It also show cases different Avtars (incarnations) of lord Shri Hari Vishnuji.

Cast
 B. Saroja Devi as Maharani Kayadhu
  Randhawa as Maharaj Hiranyakashipu 
 Satyajeet Puri as Child Rajkumar Prahlada 
  Mehmood   
 Mehmood Junior as Jamure 
 Jayshree Gadkar as Devi Lakshmi
 Dara Singh as Bhagwan Shiva
  Sujatha as Holika
 Abhi Bhattacharya as Bhagwan Vishnu

Soundtrack

External links
 

1972 films
1970s Hindi-language films
Indian fantasy films
Films scored by Kalyanji Anandji
Hindu mythological films
1970s fantasy films